Las Morteras is one of fifteen parishes (administrative divisions) in Somiedo, a municipality within the province and autonomous community of Asturias, in northern Spain.  

The postal code is 33841.

Villages
 Las Morteras
 Orderias
 Villamor

Notable residents
 Diego Flórez Valdés, historical figure

Parishes in Somiedo